Colm M. Hilliard (28 May 1936 – 14 January 2002) was an Irish Fianna Fáil politician who sat for fifteen years as Teachta Dála (TD) for Meath.

He was first elected to Dáil Éireann at the February 1982 general election, replacing retiring Labour Party TD James Tully, and giving Fianna Fáil three out of five Meath seats in the 23rd Dáil. He was re-elected at the next four general elections, until his retirement from the Dáil at the 1997 general election, when Johnny Brady retained the seat for Fianna Fáil. Hilliard was nominated to contested the 1997 elections to  the 21st Seanad Éireann on the Agricultural Panel, but as he was recovering from surgery did not contest. Despite this he received two first-preference votes in the election.

He served as Chairman of the Oireachtas Joint Services Committee from 1987 to 1992.

His father Michael Hilliard, had been a TD for Meath for thirty years, and was a Cabinet minister in the 1960s.

He worked as a livestock marketing manager, auctioneer and accountant. He played on the Meath senior Gaelic football and hurling teams.

See also
Families in the Oireachtas

References

1936 births
2002 deaths
Dual players
Fianna Fáil TDs
Irish sportsperson-politicians
Local councillors in County Meath
Meath inter-county Gaelic footballers
Meath inter-county hurlers
Members of the 23rd Dáil
Members of the 24th Dáil
Members of the 25th Dáil
Members of the 26th Dáil
Members of the 27th Dáil